Benjamin Marqué (born 11 August 2000) is a French field hockey player who plays as a midfielder or forward for Belgian Hockey League club Royal Daring and the French national team.

Club career
In club competition, Marqué currently plays for Royal Daring in the Belgian Hockey League. He joined Daring in 2020, before he played for Lille MHC.

International career

Junior national team
Benjamin Marqué made his debut for the French U–21 team in 2017. He represented the side at the EuroHockey Junior Championship II in Saint Petersburg, where he won a gold medal.

He represented the team again in 2019 at the EuroHockey Junior Championship in Valencia.

In 2021 he won a bronze medal with the team at the FIH Junior World Cup in Bhubaneswar.

Les Bleus
Benjamin Marqué made his debut for Les Bleus in 2021 at the EuroHockey Championships in Amsterdam. Later that year he was also named in the French squad for the season three of the FIH Pro League.

References

External links

2000 births
Living people
French male field hockey players
Male field hockey midfielders
Male field hockey forwards
Men's Belgian Hockey League players
Place of birth missing (living people)
Royal Daring players